A Leitura: magazine literário (Portuguese for "The Letter: a Literary Magazine")  was a review published in Lisbon, Portugal, from 1894 to 1896 which featured different genres including novels, short stories, novellas, histories and memories and theatre. The publication was read in its text by contributed greatest authors from the country and abroad including (the title with examples that refer to its authors in Volume IV): Olivieira Martins, Guiomar Torresão, Émile Zola, Mark Twain Guy de Maupassant, Leo Tolstoy, Edmundo de Amicis, Caetano da Costa Alegre from São Tomé and Príncipe and others.

See also
List of magazines in Portugal

References

External links
A Leitura: magazine litterário (1894-1896), digital copy at  Digital 

1894 establishments in Portugal
1896 disestablishments in Portugal
Defunct magazines published in Portugal
Defunct literary magazines published in Europe
Literary magazines published in Portugal
Magazines established in 1894
Magazines disestablished in 1896
Magazines published in Lisbon
Portuguese-language magazines